Marxman were a four-piece Marxist hip-hop group with two MCs formed in London in 1989. Their lyrics expounded communism and an end to economic and social injustice. They are one of only a few groups that combine hip-hop with traditional Irish compositions.

History
The band was formed by college friends Stephen Brown (Phrase D) and (MC) Hollis Michael Byrne, who also enlisted the help of Byrne's childhood friend from Ireland, Oisin Lunny, son of Irish traditional musician Dónal Lunny. The band were completed by scratch mixer DJ K One. Together they developed an overt political message in a scene dominated by Gangsta rap, inspired by Hip-Hop, Motown soul and traditional Irish music. Their debut 1992 single "Sad Affair" which borrowed lyrics from the Irish rebel song "Irish Ways and Irish Laws" was banned by the BBC. The band's later single, "All About Eve" peaked at number 28 in the UK Singles Chart, resulting in a performance on the BBC's flagship music programme Top of the Pops. Their controversial influences stemmed more from their militant socialism than traditional nationalism.

Their initial releases were on the Talkin' Loud record label and the group built a significant fanbase prior to the release of their debut single. Their debut album came the following year, when they released 33 Revolutions per Minute in the UK, before launching themselves into the American market in 1994. However the album failed to generate significant sales in the US and Marxman left Talkin' Loud for the More Rockers label. They released their second and final album in 1996, Time Capsule which was a strong album but with less overtly Irish traditional musical influences than their debut release before disbanding later in the same year.

Subject Matter
Whilst the Irish Republican themes in "Sad Affair" are well publicised, Marxman lyrics also considered themes such as domestic violence with their 1993 single "All About Eve", and comparing the African slave trade and the colonisation of Ireland to modern wage slavery in "Ship Ahoy".

Legacy
Although once touted as the Anglo-Irish answer to Public Enemy, the group themselves played down such comparisons. Their politics were at the fore and breaking down musical boundaries was paramount.  The band was very well respected live and it was onstage that the power of their music really came across. Despite working with a number of high-profile musicians, collaborating with James McNally of the Pogues and having Sinéad O'Connor as guest vocalist on the single "Ship Ahoy," the band was very much a rap group; their track "Drifting" was produced in New York by hip-hop legend DJ Premier of Gang Starr. The band also worked with SD50, Dante Ross's production team, and Mike Mangini and Shane Faber (Brand Nubian, Digable Planets and many more) were producers on Time Capsule. Marxman also supported U2 and Depeche Mode on their respective Zoo TV and Devotional tours.

Marxman toured extensively around Europe and the US and played many events and fundraisers for the various causes they believed in. A percentage of their single "All About Eve" was donated to Victim Support charities; they played a sold-out gig at London's The Jazz Cafe in support of that single and cause. They are considered to have been forerunners of the trip hop genre, alongside bands such as Massive Attack and Portishead, and contributed to the establishment of the "Bristol sound".

Discography

See also
Beltaine's Fire
Black 47
House of Pain
Manau

References

External links

Musical groups established in 1989
Musical groups disestablished in 1995
Celtic hip hop musicians
British hip hop groups
Political music groups
Irish rappers
Talkin' Loud artists